Guy Mark Foster is an American writer and academic. His short story collection The Rest of Us was a finalist for the Lambda Literary Award for Debut Fiction at the 26th Lambda Literary Awards in 2014.

A professor of African-American literature and sexuality studies at Bowdoin College, Foster's stories have also appeared in the anthologies Shadows of Love: American Gay Fiction, Brother to Brother: New Writings by Black Gay Men, and Ancestral House: The Black Short Story in the Americas and Europe.  He received his Ph.D. from Brown University.

References

External links

21st-century American short story writers
American male short story writers
Bowdoin College faculty
LGBT African Americans
Brown University alumni
African-American short story writers
American gay writers
Writers from Maine
Living people
21st-century American male writers
Year of birth missing (living people)
21st-century African-American writers
African-American male writers